Abulhasan Alibaba oglu Alakbarzadeh (1906 in Basqal, near Ismayilli – 1986 in Baku) was a Soviet Azerbaijani writer known under the pen- name Abulhasan, People's Writer of Azerbaijan (1979).

He is father of the Azerbaijani writer and journalist Chingiz Alakbarzadeh and grandfather of singer Sevda Alakbarzadeh.

References

1906 births
1986 deaths
People from Ismailli District
People from Baku Governorate
Recipients of the Order of the Red Banner of Labour
Soviet writers